

Walter von Boltenstern (26 November 1889  – 19 January 1952) was a German general in the Wehrmacht of Nazi Germany during World War II who commanded several divisions. He was a recipient of the Knight's Cross of the Iron Cross. Boltenstern was discharged from active service in 1945, later that year he was taken prisoner by the Soviet Red Army. He died in Soviet captivity at the Voikovo prison camp in 1952.

Awards and decorations

 Knight's Cross of the Iron Cross on 13 August 1941 as Generalmajor and commander of 29.Infanterie-Division

References

Citations

Bibliography

 

1889 births
1952 deaths
Military personnel from Wrocław
German Army personnel of World War I
Lieutenant generals of the German Army (Wehrmacht)
Recipients of the clasp to the Iron Cross, 1st class
Recipients of the Knight's Cross of the Iron Cross
German prisoners of war in World War II held by the Soviet Union
German people who died in Soviet detention
Reichswehr personnel
People from the Province of Silesia
20th-century Freikorps personnel